Thomas Smith may refer to:

Politics
Thomas Smith (MP for Midhurst), MP for Midhurst
Thomas Smith (MP for Great Bedwyn) (1382–1399), English politician
Thomas Smith (MP for New Romney) (1419–1432), MP for New Romney
Thomas Smith (MP for Dover), 1470–1471 
Thomas Smith (MP for Bristol), 1512, MP for Bristol
Thomas Smith (MP for Chippenham), 1554
Sir Thomas Smith (diplomat) (1513–1577), English scholar and diplomat
Thomas Smith (MP for multiple constituencies) (1522–1591), Member of Parliament for Tavistock, Aylesbury, Rye, Winchelsea and Portsmouth
Thomas Smith (MP for Wigan), MP for Wigan, 1558
Thomas Smith (English judge) (c. 1556–1609), member of Parliament for Cricklade, and for Tamworth
Thomas Smith (MP for Sudbury), MP for Sudbury, 1626
Thomas Smith (governor of South Carolina) (1648–1694), governor of South Carolina, planter, merchant and surgeon
Thomas Smith (died 1728) (c. 1686–1728), British Whig politician, MP for four constituencies 1709–1728
Thomas Smith (Royal Navy officer) (1707–1762), governor of Newfoundland and Labrador
Thomas Smith (Pennsylvania congressman) (bef. 1782–1846), Federalist member of the United States House of Representatives from Pennsylvania
Thomas Smith (Indiana congressman) (1799–1876), member of the United States House of Representatives from Indiana
Thomas Smith (Oregon politician), member of the Oregon Territorial Legislature, 1855–1856
Thomas Smith (Upper Canada politician) (1754–1833), land surveyor, merchant and politician in Upper Canada
Thomas Alexander Smith (1850–1932), educator and congressman from Maryland
Thomas B. Smith (mayor), mayor of Philadelphia 1916–1920
Thomas Eustace Smith (1831–1903), British Member of Parliament for Tynemouth and North Shields, 1868–1885
Thomas F. X. Smith (1928–1996), mayor of Jersey City, New Jersey
Thomas Francis Smith (1865–1923), lawyer and congressman from New York
Thomas Hawkins Smith (1829–1902), New South Wales politician
Thomas Henry Smith (Canadian politician) (1848–1919), politician in Manitoba, Canada
Thomas Henry Smith (American politician) (1854–1936), politician from Iowa
Thomas Richard Smith (1843–1918), New South Wales politician
Thomas S. Smith (politician) (1917–2002), member of the New Jersey General Assembly
Thomas Vernor Smith (1890–1964), congressman from Illinois, Army officer and professor
Thomas Whistler Smith (1824–1859), New South Wales politician
Thomas Smith (Australian politician) (1846–1925), Victorian politician
Sir Thomas Smith (Chester MP), English politician who sat in the House of Commons, 1640–1644
Sir Thomas Smith, 1st Baronet, of Hatherton (1622–1675), English politician
Thomas Barlow Smith (1839–1933), merchant, ship builder, author and political figure in Nova Scotia, Canada
Thomas Smith (Cavalier) (1609–1642), English Member of Parliament
Thomas Smith (East India Company) (1558–1625), English merchant, politician and first governor of the East India Company
Thomas Rhett Smith (1768–1829), intendant (mayor) of Charleston, South Carolina
Thomas Smith (Lord Mayor of London) (1746–1823), merchant and Lord Mayor of London

Judges
Thomas Smith (Indiana judge) (born 1805), Justice of the Indiana Supreme Court
Thomas Smith (Pennsylvania judge) (1745–1809), politician and judge from Pennsylvania
Thomas Cusack-Smith (1795–1866), Irish judge
Thomas Smith (English judge) (1556?–1609), Master of Requests
Thomas Sercombe Smith (1858–1937), British civil servant and judge

Military
Thomas Smith (English soldier) (fl. 1600–1627), English soldier
Thomas Benton Smith (1838–1923), Confederate brigadier general
Thomas Smith (Medal of Honor, 1865) (1838–1905), American Civil War sailor
Thomas J. Smith (Medal of Honor), American Indian Wars soldier
Thomas Smith (Medal of Honor, 1878) (1856–?), American sailor
Thomas Kilby Smith (1820–1887), lawyer, soldier, and diplomat from the state of Ohio
Thomas Adams Smith (1781–1844), American military officer and government official

Business and professional
Thomas Smith (Registrary) (fl. late 16th century), fourth recorded Registrary of the University of Cambridge
Thomas Smith (banker) (1631–1699), founder of the first bank in England outside London
Thomas Smith (engineer) (1752–1814), Scottish businessman and lighthouse engineer
Thomas Southwood Smith (1788–1861), English physician
Thomas Smith (headmaster) (1814–1879), Governor of Elmfield College (1868–?)
Thomas Roger Smith (1830–1903), English architect and academic
Sir Rudolph Smith (Thomas Rudolph Hampden Smith, 1869–1958), British surgeon
Sir Thomas Smith (barrister) (1915–1988), lawyer, soldier and academic
Thomas S. Smith (educator) (1921–2004), president of Lawrence University
Thomas Smith (finance professor) (born 1958), Australian finance professor
Thomas Smith & Sons, crane manufacturers of Rodley, West Yorkshire, UK
Sir Thomas Smith, 1st Baronet, of Stratford Place (1833–1909), British surgeon

Sports

Cricket
Thomas Smith (cricketer, born 1848) (1848–?), English cricketer
Thomas Smith (cricketer, born 1854) (1854–?), English cricketer
Thomas Smith (cricketer, born 1898) (1898–1926), Australian cricketer
Thomas Smith (cricketer, born 1899) (1899–1965), English cricketer
Thomas Smith (cricketer, born 1905) (1905–1993), English cricketer

Other sports 
Thomas Smith (Australian footballer) (1851–1909), Australian footballer
Thomas Smith (cornerback) (born 1970), American professional football player
Thomas Smith (English footballer) (1869–?), English footballer
Thomas Smith (Scottish footballer) (born 1908), Scottish footballer
Thomas Potter Smith (1901–1977), English footballer
Thomas Smith (sport shooter) (1931–2022), American Olympic shooter
Thomas H. Smith (1830–?), Irish Australian who played a role in the origin of Australian football
R. Thomas Smith (1878–1957), American thoroughbred race horse trainer
Thomas William Smith (1883–1960), rugby union forward
Thom Smith, (born 1999), English rugby union player

Others
Thomas Smith (translator and controversialist) (c. 1624–1661), scholar at Christ's College, Cambridge
Thomas Smith (bishop of Carlisle) (1615–1702), English Anglican bishop
Thomas Smith (vicar apostolic of the Northern District) (1763–1831), English Roman Catholic bishop
Thomas Smith (scholar) (1638–1710), English antiquarian
Thomas Smith (American painter) (died 1688), American artist and mariner
Thomas Smith (English painter) (died 1767), English landscape painter
Thomas Smith (Dean of Carlisle) (fl. 1548–1577), English priest
Thomas Smith (archdeacon) (fl. 1899–1955), New Zealand priest
Thomas Smith (missionary) (1817–1906), founder of the zenana missions
Thomas Smith (trade unionist) (1847–1919), English trade unionist and politician
Thomas L. Smith (1801–1866), also known as "Pegleg", American mountain man
Thomas R. Smith (poet) (born 1948), American poet
Thomas J. Smith (1830–1870), town marshal of Old West cattle town Abilene, Kansas
Thomas James Smith (1827–1896), founder of Smith & Nephew, one of the United Kingdom's largest medical devices businesses
Thomas Sydney Smith, Indian lawyer; Advocate General of Madras, 1861–1863
Thomas Stuart Smith (1815–1869), painter and philanthropist
Thomas Buckingham Smith (1810–1871), author and surveyor in Florida
Thomas Assheton Smith I (1752–1828), English landowner and all-round sportsman
Thomas Assheton Smith II (1776–1858), English landowner and all-round sportsman
W. Thomas Smith Jr. (born 1959), American author, editor, and journalist
Thomas Henry Smith (poet) (1824–1907), New Zealand judge and poet
Thomas Corregio Smith (1743–1811), painter and brother of John Raphael Smith
 Thomas Smith, fictional character living in the Nazi-occupied United States, in the television adaptation of The Man in the High Castle

See also
Thomas H. Smith (pilot boat), a 19th-century Sandy Hook pilot boat
Tom Smith (disambiguation)
Tommy Smith (disambiguation)
Thomas Smyth (disambiguation)
Thomas Smythe (disambiguation)